Rachel Bagby is a US-based, award-winning performance artist, author, poet, composer, and vocalist.

Biography
Rachel Bagby, J.D. (Stanford Law School) is the originator of the poetic form she calls Dekaaz™; a form consisting of ten syllables in three-lines. The first line is 2 syllables, the second is 3 syllables and the last line is 5 syllables. The name comes from the Greek root of the word ten (deka) + the letters "a" and "z" to signify the range of human experience that can be expressed in "just ten/syllables/...three lines 2/3/5." To complete the process of creating a Dekaaz, you must speak it out loud to another living being.

Bagby is also the author of Divine Daughters: Liberating the Power and Passion of Women's Voices (Harper San Francisco, 1999). Her publications include articles about sustainability in Natural Home, The Wall Street Journal, Time, Ms. Magazine, Women of Power, and others, as well as poetry in literary journals. Her anthologized contributions can be found in Nature and the Human Spirit: Toward an Expanded Land Management Ethic, (Venture Publishing, State College, PA, 1995); Circles of Strength: Community Alternatives to Alienation, (New Society Publishing, Philadelphia, PA 1993); Reweaving the World: The Emergence of Ecofeminism, (Sierra Club Books, San Francisco, CA 1990); and Healing the Wounds (New Society Publishing, Santa Cruz, CA: 1989).

She has released two recordings of her compositions, Full and Reach Across the Lines. Full features her soundtrack for the Emmy Award-winning documentary, Dialogues with Madwomen.

Bagby has established Singing Farm, a solar-powered, 20-acre organic farm and musical learning center in Central Virginia.

Honors
Donella Meadows Sustainability Institute Fellow (2009–2010)
Arts and Healing Network Artist of the Year Award (2008)
Bioneers Award (2003)
Advisory Council for the River of Words program, co-founded by former US Poet Laureate Robert Haas

Bibliography

Discography
Full (1993)
Reach Across the Lines (1989 and 2006)

References

External links
Official website

1956 births
Living people
American performance artists
American women singer-songwriters
American women poets
Stanford Law School alumni
21st-century American women